Church of St. Paraskevi or St. Paraskevi Church may refer to:

 Church of St. Paraskevi, Novgorod, a church in Veliky Novgorod, one of Russia's oldest
 Church of St. Paraskevi (Përmet), a church in Përmet, Gjirokastër County, Albania
 Church of Saint Paraskevi, Nesebar, a medieval Eastern Orthodox church in Nesebar, Bulgaria
 St. Paraskevi's Church, Balldren, a church in Balldren, Lezhë County, Albania
 St. Paraskevi's Church, Çetë, a church in Çetë, Kavajë Municipality, Albania
 St. Paraskevi's Church, Hllomo, a church in Hllomo, Gjirokastër County, Albania
 St. Paraskevi's Church, Hoxharë, a 13th-century church in Hoxharë, Fier County, Albania
 St. Paraskevi Church, Kwiatoń, a Gothic, wooden church located in Kwiatoń, Poland
 St. Paraskevi Church, Radruż, a Gothic, wooden church located in Radruż, Poland
 St. Paraskevi's Church, Selckë, a church in Selckë, Gjirokastër County, Albania
 St. Paraskevi's Church, Vallesh, a church in Valësh, Elbasan County, Albania